The UCLA Law Review is a bimonthly law review established in 1953 and published by students of the UCLA School of Law, where it also sponsors an annual symposium.

Membership is decided based on performance on a write-on competition. The editorial board is selected from the staff. Past editors have included federal judges Paul J. Watford, Sandra Segal Ikuta, and Kim McLane Wardlaw.

The UCLA Law Review ranks 10th in the nation among all legal law journals.

References

External links
 

Publications established in 1953
American law journals
Law Review
Bimonthly journals
English-language journals
Law journals edited by students
1953 establishments in California